A list of notable films produced in Greece before 1940 ordered by year of release.

1910s-1930s

External links
 Greek film at the IMDb

1910s
Greek
Films
Greek
Films
Greek
Films